This is a collection of the largest prizes/jackpots awarded in various lotteries.

United States 

All lottery winnings are Subject to Federal taxation (automatically reported to the Internal Revenue Service if the win is at least $600); many smaller jurisdictions also levy taxes. The IRS requires a minimum withholding of 24% of the prize (minus the wager) of any gambling win in excess of $5,000. However, the net for a major prize often is misleading; winners often owe the IRS upon filing a return because the Federal withholding was below the winner's tax obligations. Nonresident U.S. lottery winners have 30% of winnings of at least $600 withheld.

While the largest lottery prizes in the early history of U.S. state lotteries were "annuity-only", these lotteries gradually introduced a "cash option" for these games.

All prizes listed below are reported as the pre-withholdings amount, as this is taxable income the player must report on their returns to be subject to taxation. Jackpots and jackpot shares listed below are annuity amounts (and the cash value.)

Both the Mega Millions' and the Powerball's annuities are paid out in 30 annual installments, increasing 5 percent yearly.

List of U.S. lottery drawings of $300 million or more (annuity value) with at least one jackpot-winning ticket (dollar amounts in millions):

Europe
Unlike in the United States, where lottery wins are taxed, European jackpots are generally tax-free (the lotteries themselves are taxed in other ways) and jackpots are paid in a lump sum. For example, in the United Kingdom's National Lottery, wagers are split between the game operator Camelot Group and the government, with Camelot distributing its share among prizes, operating costs, profit, Camelot's 'good causes' programme, with the remainder going to the government as value-added tax (VAT) due.

Examples of largest jackpots in specific European lotteries

€230.0 million (US$235.2 million/£195.7 million) was the largest jackpot in the Euromillions history as well as the largest prize won by a British winner in the pan-European EuroMillions in sterling currency, won on 19 July 2022.
€120.0 million (US$121.0 million) was the largest jackpot in the Eurojackpot history, won on November 8, 2022 by one ticket in Germany.
€371.1 million (US$394.6 million) was the largest single-ticket jackpot in Italy's SuperEnalotto lottery, won on 16 February 2023.
€98.4 million (US$112.0 million) was the largest jackpot in Spain's La Primitiva (not to be confused with El Gordo de la Primitiva), won by a single ticket holder on Thursday 15 October 2015. The ticket was purchased in Barcelona.
€45.4 million (US$67 million) was the largest jackpot in Germany's Lotto 6 aus 49, won in December 2007 by three tickets.
€45.0 million (US$45.8 million) was the largest single-ticket jackpot in the German Lotto 6 aus 49, won on 13 April 2022.
Kr. 238 million (US$38 million) is the largest single ticket jackpot of Svenska Spel Lotto Drömvinsten
£66.1 million (US$96 million) was the largest jackpot in the United Kingdom's Lotto, won on 9 January 2016 by two tickets.
CHF 48.6 million (US$53.2 million) was the largest jackpot in Switzerland's Swiss Lotto, won on 23 August 2014.
£35.1 million (US$49.6 million) was the largest winner on the UK Lotto game in April 2016.
€38.4 million (US$49.7 million) was the largest jackpot in the Netherlands draw of the Staatsloterij (State Lottery) in May 2013.
€30,009,676 (US$31 million) was the largest jackpot in France's SuperLoto, won in May 2006 by two tickets.
€30,000,000 (US$25.7 million) was the largest single-ticket jackpot in the French Lotto, won on 04 December 2021.
€22,5 million (US$23.9 million) was the biggest lotto win in Hungary was on Eurojackpot (half of the €45 mil.) on 10 February 2017. This 7 billion forint grand prize beat a 5 billion record set up in 2003.
Kr. 215 million (€22 million, US$30 million) was the largest single-ticket jackpot in Sweden's Lotto of Svenska Spel, won on 27 March 2010.
€19.1 million (US$21.8 million) was the largest jackpot and largest single-ticket jackpot in Ireland's Lotto, won on 15 January 2022.
€12.2 million (US$15.7 million) was the largest jackpot in Finland's Lotto of Veikkaus, won in October 2012 by one ticket.
€13 million (US$17.9 million) was the largest jackpot in Belgium's Loterie Nationale/Nationale Loterij, won in December 2013 by one ticket.
₽358 million (€4.32 million/US$4.77 million) was the largest jackpot in Russia's Gosloto 6 to 45, won in February 2016 by one 1,800 rouble ticket. This is the largest jackpot in Russia.

Spain
The Spanish Christmas Lottery is considered to be the world's largest lottery. The 2011 top prize of €720 million was paid out as €4 million (US$5.2 million) to each of the 180 tickets. In 2012, the first prize was €720 million (then US$941.8 million; $1.215 billion in 2022 dollars), out of a total prize pool of €2.52 billion (US$3.297 billion; $4.255 billion in 2022 dollars). In 2016, the total prize pool was €2.310 billion ($2.414 billion). In 2020, the total prize pool was €2.38 billion ($2.897 billion).

Other

References

Economy-related lists of superlatives
Lotteries